"Himlen runt hörnet" is a song recorded by Lisa Nilsson and released as a single in 1992. In 1995, it was released in English with the title, "Ticket to Heaven". The song was given a Grammis award for "Song of the year 1992" and won the Rockbjörnen award in the "Swedish song of the year 1992" category.

Mauro Scocco version 
The song was performed by its composer Mauro Scocco, Nilsson, and Swedish blues artist Driftwood. The song formed part of his album La Dolce Vita - Det Bästa 1982-2003.

Charts

References

1992 songs
1995 singles
Lisa Nilsson songs
Songs written by Mauro Scocco